Brainerd is a surname. Notable people with the name include:

David Brainerd (1718–1747), Christian missionary to Native Americans, brother of John
Eleanor Hoyt Brainerd, U.S. novelist of the early 20th century
Elizabeth L. Brainerd (born 1963), American biologist 
Ezra Brainerd, president of Middlebury College in Vermont
John Brainerd (1720–1781), Presbyterian minister and missionary, brother of David
John Grist Brainerd (1904–1988), computer pioneer
Lawrence Brainerd, U.S. Senator from Vermont
Paul Brainerd, American businessman, computer programmer and philanthropist
Samuel Myron Brainerd, U.S. Representative from Pennsylvania